The Crossett Municipal Building is a historic multi-function municipal building at 307-309 Main Street in Crossett, Arkansas.  The Art Deco building was designed by the firm of Trapp, Clippard & Phelps, and built in 1954 by C.W. Vollmer.  Its exterior is primarily brick, with limestone trim.  Prior to its construction, the municipal services of the city were scattered throughout town, and construction of this building was authorized in order to centralize them.  The building was designed to house the public library in its north wing, the fire station in the south wing, and municipal offices, including the council chambers, mayor's office, and municipal court, in the center.  The library moved out of its space in the 1960s, after which it was taken over by the police department.

The building was listed on the National Register of Historic Places in 2007.

See also
National Register of Historic Places listings in Ashley County, Arkansas

References

Government buildings on the National Register of Historic Places in Arkansas
Art Deco architecture in Arkansas
National Register of Historic Places in Ashley County, Arkansas
Government buildings completed in 1953
1953 establishments in Arkansas
City and town halls on the National Register of Historic Places in Arkansas